Melissa Reid (born 15 November 1990) is a visually impaired British paratriathlete who competes in the PTVI classification. She is a Paralympic bronze medallist and a former World and European Champion. She is based in Falmouth in Cornwall.

Career 
Reid competes with a guide athlete in the PTVI category and was first selected for the British Triathlon Paratriathlon squad in 2012 having finished second at the 2011 ITU World Championship Series in London. Reid won her first national gold at the GBR Paratriathlon National Championships in 2013. She became ITU World Champion in 2013 and won the ETU European Championships in 2013 and 2017. She also competed for ParalympicsGB and won a bronze medal at the Rio de Janeiro Paralympic Games in 2016 in the Women's PT5 class for visually impaired athletes.

The 2017 season, saw her win gold at the Kitzbühel ETU Triathlon European Championships, she also won two bronze medals one at the Yokohama ITU World Paratriathlon Series and one at the ITU World Triathlon Grand Final Rotterdam. Reid suffered a prolapsed disc towards the tail end of 2017 which put her out of contention for 18 months.

Despite the injury, her 2019 return saw her win two golds at the Besancon ITU Paratriathlon World Cup and the Magog ITU Paratriathlon World Cup. Reid went on to claim three consecutive silvers at the ITU World Triathlon Grand Final Lausanne, Tokyo ITU Paratriathlon World Cup and the Valencia ETU Paratriathlon European Championships in 2019.

During the COVID-19 lockdown she decided to switch her guide partner to Hazel Smith who had experience working with paratriathlete Alison Peasgood (then Alison Patrick) when she became world champion. Together they had to work out how they could train together for each of the three disciplines.

Early life 
Reid was born in Nottinghamshire and moved to Cornwall when she was ten. She is a member of Gyllngvase club and was introduced to triathlon by her father, having previously taken part in surfing, swimming and surf life saving.

Competitions 
The following list of results. Unless indicated otherwise, the competitions are triathlons.

 DNF = Did not finish

 DNS = Did not start

 DSQ = Disqualified

References

1990 births
Living people
British female triathletes
Paratriathletes of Great Britain
Paralympic medalists in paratriathlon
Paralympic bronze medalists for Great Britain
Paratriathletes at the 2016 Summer Paralympics
Medalists at the 2016 Summer Paralympics
Sportspeople from Nottinghamshire
20th-century British women
21st-century British women